is a Japanese actress and voice actress. She was born in Chita, Aichi, Japan, and was affiliated with Wave Management Nagoya, Parts, and Stardust Promotion before working as a freelance actress. She is well known for playing Marika Reimon/Deka Yellow in the 2004 television series Tokusou Sentai Dekaranger. On February 27, 2014, she announced her pregnancy.

Filmography

Film

Specials

Television

Idol videos
Puro (2004)
Collaboration Box (2004)
Lettre (2005)
La Dolce (2006)

References

External links
 Official blog(In Japanese)
 Old official blog
 
 

Japanese gravure idols
Japanese television personalities
Japanese voice actresses
1982 births
Living people
People from Chita, Aichi
Actors from Aichi Prefecture
Former Stardust Promotion artists
Models from Aichi Prefecture